Beyond the Season is the first Christmas album by American country music artist Garth Brooks. It was released on August 25, 1992, however it was the first album on Liberty Records, and peaked at number 2 on both of Billboard magazine's Billboard 200 and Top Country Albums sales charts that year.  Beyond the Season was also the best-selling Christmas/holiday album of 1992 in the United States with sales of 1,542,000 copies for the year according to Nielsen SoundScan. As of November 2014, the album has cumulative sales of 2,650,000 copies in the U.S. and is the seventeenth best-selling Christmas/holiday album in the U.S. during the entire SoundScan era (March 1991 – present).

On November 15, 1995, Beyond the Season was certified Triple Platinum by the Recording Industry Association of America for shipment of 3 million copies in the United States.

Track listing

Chart performance 
Beyond the Season peaked at #2 on the U.S. Billboard 200, and on the Top Country Albums. In November 1995, Beyond the Season was certified 3 x Platinum by the RIAA.

Weekly charts

Year-end charts

Singles

Certifications

Personnel 
 Garth Brooks – lead vocals, harmony vocals (3, 8, 9), acoustic guitar
 Bobby Wood – acoustic piano, keyboards
 Joey Miskulin – accordion (4)
 Mark Casstevens – acoustic guitar
 Chris Leuzinger – acoustic guitar (1-9), electric guitars (1-9)
 Bruce Bouton – steel guitar (3, 5, 8)
 Mike Chapman – bass (1-9)
 Milton Sledge – drums (1-9), percussion (1-9)
 Rob Hajacos – fiddle (3, 8)
 Charles Cochran – string arrangements (10, 11)
 Cynthia Reynolds Wyatt – harp (10, 11)
 Bob Mason – cello (10)
 Gary Vanosdale – viola (10)
 Carl Gorodetzky – violin (10)
 Pamela Sixfin – violin (10)
 The Nashville String Machine – strings (11)
 Christ Church Choir – choir (5)
 Landy Gardner – choir director (5)
 Trisha Yearwood – harmony vocals (5, 9)
 Allen Reynolds – harmony vocals (9)
 Jim Rooney – harmony vocals (9)

Backing Vocals (Tracks 1 & 11)
 Bob Bailey, Johnny Cobb, Gary Chapman, Vicki Hampton, Emily Harris, Yvonne Hodges, Jana King, Donna McElroy, Donna Morris, Howard Smith and Dennis Wilson

Production 
 Allen Reynolds – producer 
 Mark Miller – recording, mixing 
 Matt Allen – recording assistant 
 Carlos Grier – digital editing 
 Denny Purcell – mastering at Georgetown Masters (Nashville, Tennessee).
 Virginia Team – art direction 
 Jerry Joyner – design 
 Beverly Parker – photography

References and external links
Beyond the Season at planetgarth.com

1992 Christmas albums
Garth Brooks albums
Liberty Records albums
Christmas albums by American artists
Albums produced by Allen Reynolds
Country Christmas albums